St. Michael's Indian Residential School was a Canadian residential school in Alert Bay, British Columbia, operated by the Anglican Church of Canada for First Nations children.

History 

The first residential school in Alert Bay was built in 1882. St. Michael's was constructed in 1929 as a regional facility. From Campbell River to Prince Rupert, British Columbia and closed in 1975. It was built at a cost of about $250,000 by the federal Department of Indian Affairs next to the U’Mista Cultural Centre which housed the potlatch collection seized by the federal government in 1921 from the Kwakwaka’wakw people.

With space for 200 live-in students, it was the largest operated by the Anglican Church at that time. At the school, First Nations students were prohibited from speaking their language and kept away from their families for years.

Indigenous children from Northern Vancouver Island and the province's north coast, including from Bella Bella, Bella Coola, the Nisga’a territories and Haida Gwaii were educated at the four-storey red-brick building in the remote community of Alert Bay.

In 1934, the Indian Residential School Commission of the Missionary Society of the Church of England. published that it thanked "Almighty God for what has been accomplished: for a race of people brought in the shortest period of time known in history from the most debasing savagery to citizenship both in the Kingdom of our God and in his God-blessed Dominion of Canada."

After its closure in 1975, the 'Namgis First Nation was given control of the building and used it for a number of purposes, including housing its own school, a restaurant, a nightclub and band offices. An attempt to raise $15 million in 2001 to house a language centre was unsuccessful. Carvers began using the space but heating and maintenance costs resulted in the band's closure of the building in 2012.

In the early 21st Century, Canada's Indian Residential Schools Truth and Reconciliation Commission judged claims about physical and sexual abuse in the former school and awarded compensation to complainants.

In February 2015, church leaders, First Nations (including representatives of Assembly of First Nations), politicians and former students attended a healing/cleansing ceremony hosted by the 'Namgis First Nation to mark the demolition of the closed school's building.

See also 
List of Canadian residential schools

References 

Residential schools in British Columbia
1929 establishments in British Columbia
1975 disestablishments in British Columbia
Defunct schools in Canada
Educational institutions established in 1929
Educational institutions disestablished in 1975
Kwakwaka'wakw
Regional District of Mount Waddington